Charleymayne, or the Distracted Emperor is an early modern play dated around 1600, derived from the Egerton Collection manuscript formerly in the British Museum and now British Library, MS Egerton 1994. It is the only Jacobean play to survive in manuscript form. Its first printing appears to be by A. H. Bullen in his A Collection of Old English Plays, Volume II (page 167 on). Bullen gives this text the title The Distracted Emperor, but on Egerton it is entitled simply, Charleymayne. Although in manuscript the play is anonymous, the script shows signs of a collaborative effort, with Act One possibly by George Chapman, and the rest by a young John Fletcher (or the usual suspects, Greene, Kidd, Lodge).

It was printed for the  Malone Society by John de Monins Johnson at the Oxford University Press in 1937.

The play is animated by a myriad of political intrigue, suspicion and conspiracy in the medieval court of the ageing Charlemagne.
Act I opens with news that Charlemagne has married Theodora, and at the heart of the play's machinations are the new empress's siblings, the Machiavellian Ganelon and Gabriella (in love with courtier Richard). In recognition of his help in arranging the royal marriage, Ganelon is promoted as Constable of France, and amid the euphoric atmosphere there comes news of Prince Orlando's conquests in Spain. 

In Act Two, a triumphant Orlando has reached the outskirts of Paris where his reflections on his love of Theodora are devastated by news of the birth to her of a son. Worse, she has died in childbirth, followed by the death of Charlemagne's mother. The emperor is utterly distraught, carrying his wife's corpse around - until that is, Richard discovers and removes a strange ring beneath her tongue. The effect is profound and immediate. Charlemagne becomes utterly focused and businesslike, yet, mysteriously falls in love with Bishop Turpin. Meanwhile Ganelon is placed under house-arrest for the attempted murder of Orlando.

Act Three sees the emperor now in sharp mental decline, relying on the advice of sycophants like Turpin. Ganelon is further punished, heavily fined, stripped of all honours and forbidden to communicate with Richard. Nevertheless, Ganelon blesses the proposed marriage of his son, La Busse. Gabriella is in despair that she is forbidden even to meet her Richard.

In the following act La Busse petitions Charlemagne to have his father's former wealth and titles restored (amid rumours that these are actually to be bestowed on Richard). While at first rejecting his overtures, Charlemagne bizarrely promises to assent to La Busse's request on that day when he meets the young man on an ass in a deserted country lane.

Most of these and other heady machinations find their faltering denouement in Act Five, which opens with a botched ambush in which  Richard, conspiring on behalf of Prince Orlando, is murdered by Ganelon. A letter is discovered on Richard's body incriminating Ganelon in a plot and imputing, his sister, Gabriella's whoring. She in fact admits the letter as her own fabrication for which he murders her, and he is promptly arrested. La Busse abases himself, as required, before Charlemagne, with the result that Ganelon is briefly pardoned - that is until Orlando announces the truth of the 'witchcraft ring' and of Ganelon's crimes. In a more or less happy ending, Charlemagne orders Ganelon to be 'broken on the wheel' and Orlando is rewarded with the governorship of Spain.

Though not claiming anything like chronicle accuracy, the play does demonstrate a clearly assured dramaturgy in coping with its many plot twists. There is also a curious 'chaining' effect as characters replace each other in turn within a setting. The tentative dating of the play as 1600 is undermined by the many liftings from Shakespeare's Hamlet, Macbeth and King Lear. Curiously too it anticipates strong thematic elements of James I/VI court and reign.

Act One's highly regular blank verse  suggests Chapman's mighty line, but clearly there are other quills at work here.

References 

Cultural depictions of Charlemagne
English Renaissance plays
Plays by George Chapman